FUF may refer to:

 Freedom and Unity Front, a political party in Uganda
 Friends of the Urban Forest, an American environmental organization
 Pular language, spoken in Guinea
 Uruguayan Football Federation, active 1923 to 1925
 BSG Fleisch und Frischeierproduktion Falkensee, now SV Falkensee-Finkenkrug, a German football club